Matea Matošević (born 14 March 1989) is a Croatian long distance runner who specialises in the marathon. She competed in the women's marathon event at the 2016 Summer Olympics.

References

External links
 

1989 births
Living people
Croatian female long-distance runners
Croatian female marathon runners
Sportspeople from Zagreb
Athletes (track and field) at the 2016 Summer Olympics
Olympic athletes of Croatia
20th-century Croatian women
21st-century Croatian women